Landrum Island is the southernmost of the three Bugge Islands in the south part of Marguerite Bay, Fallières Coast, Antarctica. The island was called "Isla Latorre" by the Chilean Antarctic Expedition, 1947, and was later named by the Advisory Committee on Antarctic Names for biologist Betty J. Landrum of the Smithsonian Oceanographic Sorting Center, 1965–89, serving as Director, 1973–78.

References

Islands of Graham Land
Fallières Coast